"Addicted to You" is a song by Swedish DJ and record producer Avicii, incorporating vocals by American folk rock singer Audra Mae. The track was written by Avicii, Arash Pournouri, Mac Davis and Josh Krajcik for making appearance on Avicii's debut studio album, True (2013), with it being later released as its fourth single. "Addicted to You" first premiered to Australian radio on 23  November 2013; a digital single of "Addicted to You" remixes was released on 11 March 2014.

Music video
The music video was directed by Sebastian Ringler and was shot in Gällivare and Vaxholm. It is inspired by the story of Bonnie and Clyde and set in the 1930s. The video begins by showing a woman working in a bar as a waitress (played by Swedish actress Madeleine Minou Martin). At the same time, a blond woman enters (played by Swedish actress Hedda Stiernstedt) and asks for a drink. She sips it and then throws the glass against the wall behind the bar. This is the signal for them to draw their guns and rob the place. After, they tour the snowy roads in a car. Arriving at night at home, they lie down on a bed while caressing passionately.

They subsequently decide to rob a bank, and in the process they stop and start kissing passionately at a table while the still-terrified bank clients watch. The blonde woman places an explosive on the door of the safe box, but the police arrive and a sniper shoots her dead. Finally, her grieving girlfriend decides to take revenge by taking the explosive off of the safe, running out to the waiting police officers, and suicidally blows them all up.

Track listing 
Digital download — remix
"Addicted to You" (David Guetta Remix) – 5:18

Digital download — remixes
"Addicted to You" (Avicii by Avicii) – 5:31
"Addicted to You" (David Guetta Remix) – 5:18
"Addicted to You" (Ishaan Manchanda Remix) – 3:48
"Addicted to You" (Sick Individuals Remix) – 5:00
"Addicted to You" (Albin Myers Remix) – 5:31
"Addicted to You" (Ashley Wallbridge Remix) – 4:51
"Addicted to You" (Bent Collective Remix) – 5:57

Personnel 
Musicians
 Audra Mae – vocals
 Tim Bergling – writer, producer
 Arash Pournouri – writer, producer

Additional personnel
 Mac Davis – writer
 Josh Krajcik – writer

Charts and certifications

Weekly charts

Year-end charts

Certifications and sales

Release history

See also
 List of number-one dance singles of 2014 (U.S.)

References

2013 singles
Avicii songs
Songs written by Mac Davis
2013 songs
Soul ballads
Songs written by Avicii
Number-one singles in Poland
Song recordings produced by Avicii
Songs written by Arash Pournouri